Tâmega Subregion is a former NUTS3 subregion, part of the NUTS2 region of Norte Region, Portugal. It was abolished at the January 2015 NUTS 3 revision. Its name derives from the Tâmega River that crosses through the subregion. With 558,000 inhabitants (2005) it is the fourth most populated subregion in Portugal. It has several important urban centers  - Paços de Ferreira (pop. 41,000), Lousada (pop. 25,000), Penafiel (24,000), Paredes and Felgueiras (pop. 21,000) - being one of the most decentralized of the Portuguese subregions.
The chief city is Penafiel. Other important cities are: Amarante, Felgueiras, Freamunde, Gandra, Lixa, Marco de Canaveses, Paços de Ferreira, Paredes, Rebordosa and São Salvador de Lordelo.
Important towns: Baião, Cabeceiras de Basto, Castelo de Paiva (Sobrado), Cinfães, Lousada, Resende, Ribeira de Pena and Vila Meã.

The main economical activities are centered on light industry, furniture, agriculture and wine.

It covers an area of 2,631 km2 with a density of 212 inhabitants/km2.
Main rivers: Douro River, Tâmega River and Sousa River.

Municipalities
The 15 municipalities that comprise the subregion are:

 Amarante
 Baião
 Cabeceiras de Basto
 Castelo de Paiva
 Celorico de Basto
 Cinfães
 Felgueiras
 Lousada
 Marco de Canaveses
 Mondim de Basto
 Paços de Ferreira
 Paredes
 Penafiel
 Resende
 Ribeira de Pena

References

Former NUTS 3 statistical regions of Portugal